National Research Institute for Science Policy (NRISP) is an Iranian organisation established in 1980 to act as a research institute and think tank for the Ministry of Science, Research and Technology.

Publications 
NRISP publishes four periodicals:
 Journal of Science and Technology Policy (Quarterly)  
 Rahyāft (Science Policy Quarterly)  
 Daneshgar (Scientific Journal-Monthly) 
 Science and Research Newsletter

Departments 
NRISP consists of six departments:
 Futures studies research department,
 Economy of science research department,
 Public understanding of science research department,
 Scientometrics department,
 Science and society research department, and
 Science policy research department.

See also 
 International rankings of Iran
 Science and technology in Iran

References

External links 
 

Research institutes in Iran
Research institutes established in 1980
1980 establishments in Iran